The 2011 Girls' EuroHockey Youth Championship was the 6th edition of the Girls' EuroHockey Youth Championship. The tournament was held from 12 to 17 July 2011 in Utrecht, Netherlands at the De Klapperboom.

Netherlands won the tournament for the fourth time after defeating Germany 4–1 in the final.

Format
The eight teams were split into two groups of four teams. The top two teams advanced to the semifinals to determine the winner in a knockout system. The bottom two teams played in a new group with the teams they did not play against in the group stage. The bottom two teams were relegated to the EuroHockey Youth Championship II.

Qualified teams
The following teams participated in the 2011 EuroHockey Youth Championship:

Officials
The following umpires were appointed by the EHF and FIH to officiate the tournament:

Ana Faias (POR)
Ines El Hajem (FRA)
Heike Holthausen (GER)
Alison Keogh (IRE)
Adrienne Lijs (NED)
Hanneke Menting (NED)
Sylvie Petitjean (FRA)
Brigitta Sedy (AUT)
Montserrat Solózano (ESP)
Alwine Sterk (NED)
Kerri Target (SCO)
Lia Waine (ENG)
Nicole Wajer (NED)
Nicole de Winter (NED)

Results

Preliminary round

Pool A

Pool B

Classification round

Fifth to eighth place classification
Points from the preliminary round were carried over to Pool C to determine group standings.

Pool C

First to fourth place classification

Semi-finals

Third and fourth place

Final

Awards
The following awards were presented at the conclusion of the tournament:

Statistics

Final standings

Goalscorers

References

External links
European Hockey Federation

Girls' EuroHockey Youth Championships
Youth
EuroHockey Youth Championships
EuroHockey Youth Championships
International women's field hockey competitions hosted by the Netherlands
EuroHockey Youth Championships